FMOD is a proprietary sound effects engine and authoring tool for video games and applications developed by Firelight Technologies. It is able to play and mix sounds of diverse formats on many operating systems.

Features
The FMOD sound system is supplied as a programmer's API and authoring tool, similar to a digital audio workstation.

FMOD consists of the following technologies:
 FMOD Studio - An audio creation tool for games, designed like a digital audio workstation. Succeeds FMOD Designer.
 FMOD Studio run-time API - A programmer API to interface with FMOD Studio.
 FMOD Studio low-level API - A programmer API that stands alone, with a simple interface for playing sound files, adding special effects and performing 3D sound.

Legacy products include:
 FMOD Ex - The sound playback and mixing engine.
 FMOD Designer 2010 - An audio designer tool used for authoring complex sound events and music for playback.
 FMOD Event Player - An auditioning tool in conjunction with FMOD Designer 2010.

The FMOD sound system has an advanced plugin architecture that can be used to extend the support of audio formats or to develop new output types, e.g. for streaming.

Licensing 
FMOD is available under multiple license schemes:
 FMOD Non-Commercial License, which allows software not intended for commercial distribution to use FMOD for free.
 FMOD Indie License, a bottom level license for software intended for commercial distribution, with development budgets less than US$500k.
 FMOD Basic License, a mid-level license for software intended for commercial distribution, with development budgets between US$500k and US$1.5m.
 FMOD Premium License, a top level license for software intended for commercial distribution, with development budgets over US$1.5m.

Support

Platforms
FMOD is written in portable C++, and can thus run on many different PC, mobile and gaming console platforms including:
Microsoft Windows (x86 and x86-64), macOS,
iOS,
Linux (x86 and x86-64),
Android,
BlackBerry,
Wii, Wii U, 3DS, Nintendo Switch,
Xbox, Xbox 360, Xbox One,
PlayStation 2, PlayStation 3, PlayStation 4, PlayStation Portable, PlayStation Vita,
and
Google Native Client.

FMOD contains support for AMD TrueAudio, and Sound Blaster hardware acceleration.

File formats 
FMOD can play back the following audio formats: AIFF, ASF, ASX, DLS, FLAC, FSB (FMOD's sample bank format), IT, M3U, MIDI, MOD, MP2, MP3, Ogg Vorbis, PLS, S3M, VAG (PS2/PSP format), WAV, WAX (Windows Media Audio Redirector), WMA, XM, XMA (only on the Xbox 360), as well as raw audio data.

Game engines
FMOD has been integrated as a primary sound-effects system into the following video game engines:
 Unity from Unity Technologies
 Unreal Engine 3 from Epic Games
 Unreal Engine 4 from Epic Games
 CryEngine from Crytek
 Torque Game Engine from GarageGames
 BigWorld Technology from Bigworld Technology
 Scaleform from Scaleform Corporation
 Havok Vision Engine
Havok Project Anarchy
 Source from Valve
 HeroEngine from Idea Fabrik Plc.
 Prism3D from SCS Software
 Red Engine 1 and 2 from CD Projekt
 Halo Engine from Bungie

Games using FMOD 
FMOD has been used in many high-profile commercial games since release; this is a partial list.

 3D Ultra Minigolf
 Allods Online
 American Truck Simulator 
 Arcaea 
 Ashes Cricket 2009
 Assetto Corsa
 Audition Online
 Automation
 Batman: Arkham Asylum
 Battlestations: Pacific
 Bastion
 BeamNG.drive
 BioShock
 BioShock2
 Brütal Legend
 Bugsnax
 Carrion
 Castlevania: Lords of Shadow 2
 Cavern Commandos
 Celeste
 Clive Barker's Jericho
 Cookie Run: Kingdom
 Cortex Command
 Crossout
 Crysis
 Darkest Dungeon
 Darkfall
 Dark Souls
 Daymare 1998
 DJ Hero
 DJMax Respect V
 De Blob
 Deus Ex: Human Revolution
 Diablo 3
 Diner Dash Adventures
 Dragon Age: Origins
 Dogfighter
 Dwarf Fortress
 Dying Light
 Euro Truck Simulator 2
 Fall Guys
 Far Cry
 Fast & Furious Crossroads
 Final Fantasy X/X-2 HD Remaster
 Forts
 Forza Motorsport 2
 Forza Motorsport 3
 Guild Wars
 Guild Wars 2
 Guitar Hero III
 Guitar Hero: Aerosmith
 Guitar Hero: World Tour
 Geometry Dash
 Hades
 Halo 3
 Halo 3: ODST
 Halo: Reach
 Hard Reset
 Heavenly Sword
 Heroes of Newerth
 Hellgate: London
 Hitman: Absolution
 Hypercharge: Unboxed
 Impressive Title
 Into the Breach
 iRacing.com
 Jurassic Park: Operation Genesis
 Just Cause 2
 KartRider: Drift
 League of Legends (replaced by Wwise after patch 4.7)
 Lego Universe
 Limbus Company
 LittleBigPlanet
 Mechwarrior Online
 Metroid Prime 3: Corruption
 Minecraft (Bedrock Edition)
 Minecraft: Story Mode
 Music Construction Set: Eleven
 My Hero Academia: The Strongest Hero
 New Retro Arcade: Neon
 Natural Selection 2
 Need for Speed: Shift
 Nickelodeon Kart Racers
 Nicktoons Unite!
 Nicktoons: Battle for Volcano Island
 No More Room in Hell
 Noita
 Operation Flashpoint: Dragon Rising
 Orwell
 Path of Exile
 Patrick's Parabox
 Pizza Tower
 Planetary Annihilation
 Project Cars 3
 Project Torque
 Pure
 Pyre
 Quake Champions
 Renegade Ops
 Reus
 Rise of Flight: The First Great Air War
 Roblox
 ROW Europe: Ruins Of War
 Ruiner
 Run8
 Scrap Mechanic
 Second Life
 Shadowgrounds
 Shadowgrounds: Survivor
 Shantae and the Seven Sirens
 Shatter
 Shattered Horizon
 Shovel Knight
 Silent Hill: Shattered Memories 
 SOMA (video game)
 Spelunky 2
 StarCraft II: Wings of Liberty
 Stargate Worlds
 Star Stable Online
 Star Trek Online
 Stranglehold
 Subnautica
 Super Motherload
 Sven Co-op
 The Forest
 theHunter: Call of The Wild
 The Jackbox Party Pack 7
 The Swapper
 TimeShift
 TNA iMPACT!
 Tom Clancy's Ghost Recon
 Tomb Raider: Underworld
 Tomb Raider
 Torchlight
 Torchlight III
 Transistor
 Trine
 Tropico 3
 The Walking Dead
 Unravel
 Vessel
 Viscerafest
 vSide
 War Thunder
 Warcraft III
 Where's My Perry
 Where's My Water?
 Where's My Water? 2
 Wobbly Life
 World of Subways
 World of Warcraft
 Worms W.M.D
 X-Plane (simulator)
 You Don't Know Jack
 Zuma

See also 
 OpenAL
 irrKlang
 AMD TrueAudio
 Audiokinetic Wwise

References

External links
 Project home page
  – special version of Oculus VR's "Tuscany Demo" showcasing GenAudio's AstoundSound with calculations shunted to AMD TrueAudio

Audio libraries
Middleware
Video game development software
Video game development software for Linux
Video game music technology